Tušimice Power Station is a lignite-fired power station in Tušimice, part of the town Kadaň in the Ústí nad Labem Region of the Czech Republic. It is owned and operated by ČEZ Group.

The first power station in Tušimice (Tušimice I) was commissioned in 1963–1964. The current power station (Tušimice II) was commissioned in 1973–1974. The power station consists of four generation units with a capacity of 200 MW each. Its turbines and generators are produced by Škoda, and steam boilers are produced by Vítkovické železárny. Tušimice II has a  flue-gas stack built in 1974.

The power station is supplied by lignite from the local Nástup–Tušimice Mines.

See also

Energy in the Czech Republic
List of power stations in the Czech Republic

References

External links
 http://www.skyscraperpage.com/diagrams/?b5015
 ČEZ website
 Demolition of ETU I

Energy infrastructure completed in 1964
Energy infrastructure completed in 1974
Towers completed in 1974
Chimneys in the Czech Republic
Coal-fired power stations in the Czech Republic